Festival is an album by American jazz guitarist Lee Ritenour that was released in 1988 by GRP Records. The album is a collaboration between musicians from New York City, Los Angeles, and Brazil. Festival reached No. 3 on the Billboard Contemporary Jazz chart.

Track listing
"Night Rhythms" (Ritenour) – 4:32
"Latin Lovers" (Aldir Blanc, Joao Bosco) – 6:17
"Humana" (Ivan Lins, Vítor Martins) – 4:39
"Rio Sol" (Tim Landers) – 5:24
"Waiting for You" (Ritenour) – 2:23
"Odile, Odila" (Joao Bosco, Martinho da Vila) – 4:58
"Linda – Voce E Linda" (Caetano Veloso) – 5:28
"New York/Brazil" (Ritenour) – 4:22
"The Inner Look" (Bob James) – 5:17

Personnel
 Lee Ritenour – guitar, synthesizer
 Jerry Hey – horn
 Larry Williams – horn
 Ernie Watts – alto and tenor saxophones
 Dave Grusin – keyboards
 Bob James – keyboards
 Joao Bosco – guitar, vocals
 Anthony Jackson – bass
 Marcus Miller – bass
 Omar Hakim – drums
 Carlinhos Brown – cabasa, djembe, pandeiro, percussion
 Paulinho da Costa – percussion
 Robbie Kondor – keyboards
 Caetano Veloso – vocals
 Gracinha Leporace – backing vocals

Charts

References

External links
Lee Ritenour - Festival at Discogs
Lee Ritenour's Official Site

1988 albums
GRP Records albums
Lee Ritenour albums
Portuguese-language albums